The 2011 Women's EuroHockey Championship II was the 4th edition of the Women's EuroHockey Championship II and the first edition with the new name. It was held from 6 to 14 August 2011 in Poznan, Poland.  The tournament also served as a qualifier for the 2013 EuroHockey Championship, with the finalists Scotland and Belarus qualifying.

Qualified teams

Format
The eight teams were split into two groups of four teams. The top two teams advanced to the semifinals to determine the winner in a knockout system. The bottom two teams played in a new group with the teams they did not play against in the group stage. The last two teams were relegated to the EuroHockey Championship III.

Results
All times were local (UTC+2).

Preliminary round

Pool A

Pool B

Fifth to eighth place classification

Pool C
The points obtained in the preliminary round against the other team are taken over.

First to fourth place classification

Semifinals

Third and fourth place

Final

Final standings

See also
2011 Men's EuroHockey Championship II
2011 Women's EuroHockey Nations Championship

References

2011
EuroHockey Championship II
International women's field hockey competitions hosted by Poland
EuroHockey Championship II Women
EuroHockey Championship II
Sport in Poznań
21st century in Poznań
Women 2